Máel Brigte is a Pictish or Irish name meaning "devotee of St Brigid".

People with the given name

 Máel Ísu I of Cennrígmonaid, aka Máel Brigte I of Cennrígmonaid, 10th-century Bishop
 Máel Brigte of Moray 10th-century Pictish Mormaer of Moray
 Máel Brigte of Perth, 12th-century Scottish administrator
 Máel Brigte mac Tornáin, 10th century Abbot of Iona
 Máel Brigte úa Máel Úanaig, the writer of the 12th century illuminated manuscript, the Gospels of Máel Brigte
 Marianus Scotus, 11th-century Irish monk and chronicler

Irish masculine given names